In algebraic geometry, a mixed Hodge structure is an algebraic structure containing information about the cohomology of general algebraic varieties. It is a generalization of a Hodge structure, which is used to study smooth projective varieties.

In mixed Hodge theory, where the decomposition of a cohomology group  may have subspaces of different weights, i.e. as a direct sum of Hodge structures

where each of the Hodge structures have weight . One of the early hints that such structures should exist comes from the long exact sequence of a pair of smooth projective varieties .

Motivation 
Originally, Hodge structures were introduced as a tool for keeping track of abstract Hodge decompositions on the cohomology groups of smooth projective algebraic varieties. These structures gave geometers new tools for studying algebraic curves, such as the Torelli theorem, Abelian varieties, and the cohomology of smooth projective varieties. One of the chief results for computing Hodge structures is an explicit decomposition of the cohomology groups of smooth hypersurfaces using the relation between the Jacobian ideal and the Hodge decomposition of a smooth projective hypersurface through Griffith's residue theorem. Porting this language to smooth non-projective varieties and singular varieties requires the concept of mixed Hodge structures.

Definition 
A mixed Hodge structure (MHS) is a triple  such that

  is a -module of finite type

Remark on filtrations 
Note that similar to Hodge structures, mixed Hodge structures use a filtration instead of a direct sum decomposition since the cohomology groups with anti-holomorphic terms,  where , don't vary holomorphically. But, the filtrations can vary holomorphically, giving a better defined structure.

Morphisms of mixed Hodge structures 
Morphisms of mixed Hodge structures are defined by maps of abelian groupssuch thatand the induced map of -vector spaces has the property

Further definitions and properties

Hodge numbers 
The Hodge numbers of a MHS are defined as the dimensionssince  is a weight  Hodge structure, andis the -component of a weight  Hodge structure.

Homological properties 
There is an Abelian category of mixed Hodge structures which has vanishing -groups whenever the cohomological degree is greater than : that is, given mixed hodge structures  the groupsfor pg 83.

Mixed Hodge structures on bi-filtered complexes 
Many mixed Hodge structures can be constructed from a bifiltered complex. This includes complements of smooth varieties defined by the complement of a normal crossing variety. Given a complex of sheaves of abelian groups  and filtrations  of the complex, meaningThere is an induced mixed Hodge structure on the hyperhomology groupsfrom the bi-filtered complex . Such a bi-filtered complex is called a mixed Hodge complex

Logarithmic complex 
Given a smooth variety  where  is a normal crossing divisor (meaning all intersections of components are complete intersections), there are filtrations on the logarithmic de Rham complex  given byIt turns out these filtrations define a natural mixed Hodge structure on the cohomology group  from the mixed Hodge complex defined on the logarithmic complex .

Smooth compactifications 
The above construction of the logarithmic complex extends to every smooth variety; and the mixed Hodge structure is isomorphic under any such compactificaiton. Note a smooth compactification of a smooth variety  is defined as a smooth variety  and an embedding  such that  is a normal crossing divisor. That is, given compactifications  with boundary divisors  there is an isomorphism of mixed Hodge structureshowing the mixed Hodge structure is invariant under smooth compactification.

Example 
Then, the Hypercohomology is justthe first vector space are just the constant sections, hence the differential is the zero map. The second is the vector space is isomorphic to the vector space spanned byThen  has a weight  mixed Hodge structure and  has a weight  mixed Hodge structure.

Examples

Complement of a smooth projective variety by a closed subvariety 
Given a smooth projective variety  of dimension  and a closed subvariety  there is a long exact sequence in cohomologypg7-8coming from the distinguished triangleof constructible sheaves. There is another long exact sequencefrom the distinguished trianglewhenever  is smooth. Note the homology groups  are called Borel–Moore homology, which are dual to cohomology for general spaces and the  means tensoring with the Tate structure  add weight  to the weight filtration. The smoothness hypothesis is required because Verdier duality implies , and  whenever  is smooth. Also, the dualizing complex for  has weight , hence . Also, there is the perfect duality paringgiving an isomorphism of the two groups.

Algebraic torus 
A one dimensional algebraic torus  is isomorphic to the variety , hence its cohomology groups are isomorphic toThe long exact exact sequence then readsSince  and  this gives the exact sequencesince there is a twisting of weights for well-defined maps of mixed Hodge structures, there is the isomorphism

Quartic K3 surface minus a genus 3 curve 
Then, the Gysin sequence gives the long exact sequenceBut, it is a result that the maps  take a Hodge class of type  to a Hodge class of type . The Hodge structures for both the K3 surface and the curve are well-known, and can be computed using the Jacobian ideal. In the case of the curve there are two zero maps  hence  contains the weight one pieces . Therefore,The induced filtrations on these graded pieces are the Hodge filtrations coming from each cohomology group.

See also 

 Motive (algebraic geometry)
 Jacobian ideal
 Milnor fiber
 Mixed Hodge module

References

Examples 

 A Naive Guide to Mixed Hodge Theory
 Introduction to Limit Mixed Hodge Structures
 Deligne’s Mixed Hodge Structure for Projective Varieties with only Normal Crossing Singularities

In Mirror Symmetry 

 Local B-Model and Mixed Hodge Structure

Algebraic geometry
Homological algebra
Hodge theory